Glen Scantlebury (born 1955) is an American film editor, director, and screenwriter. He has edited major studio feature films such as Con Air and Transformers, and has worked primarily in the action and horror film genres.

Biography
Currently based in San Francisco, Scantlebury was born in Annandale, Virginia in 1955, and attended Virginia Commonwealth University.

Film editing
In 1981, Scantlebury became a member (performer and crew) of The Video Band, for which he edited a series of experimental music videos released in the early 1980s.

Scantlebury became one of the first editors to edit feature films on video, beginning in 1987 with the Tom Waits concert film Big Time (1988). He subsequently worked at Zoetrope Studios for five years. He was cited by Variety in 2009 as a "key cutter" among director Michael Bay's "trusted team of editors."

In addition to editing feature films, Scantlebury has edited numerous music videos and 
documentaries. In 2012, Scantlebury was invited to join the Academy of Motion Picture Arts and Sciences.

Independent film production
Scantlebury is an independent filmmaker, operating Pavement Pictures in partnership with his wife, Lucy Phillips. Phillips is a producer, director, and screenwriter.

Abducted, the fourth feature film written and directed by Phillips and Scantlebury, appeared as an Xbox exclusive release in September 2013, and was released on DVD in October 2013. It won the 2013 Shriekfest Horror/Sci-Fi Film Festival award for Best Sci-Fi Feature Film.

Filmography

Editing 
 1988: Big Time
 1990: The Spirit of '76
 1990: The Godfather Part III
 1992: Bram Stoker's Dracula
 1993: Steal America
 1995: My Dubious Sex Drive
 1996: The Rock
 1997: Little Dieter Needs to Fly
 1997: Con Air
 1998: Armageddon
 1999: The General's Daughter
 2001: Lara Croft: Tomb Raider
 2001: Joy Ride
 2003: The Texas Chainsaw Massacre (remake)
 2004: My Tiny Universe
 2005: Two for the Money
 2007: Pathfinder
 2007: Transformers
 2008: Tropic Thunder
 2009: Friday the 13th (remake)
 2010: A Nightmare on Elm Street (remake)
 2011: Dream House
 2012: Stolen (formerly titled Medallion)
 2012: Twixt
 2013: Carrie (remake)
 2014: Teenage Mutant Ninja Turtles
 2015: Papa: Hemingway in Cuba
 2015: Muddy Track
 2020: Mainstream

Directing 
Co-credited with Lucy Phillips:
 1993: "Jimmy Still Comes Around" (music video by The Loud Family)
 1995: My Dubious Sex Drive
 2004: My Tiny Universe
 2013: Abducted

Screenwriting 
Co-credited with Lucy Phillips:
 1993: Steal America
 1995: My Dubious Sex Drive
 2004: My Tiny Universe
 2013: Abducted

Editing and musical performance 
Music videos with The Video Band:
 1982: "From the Field"
 1982: "The Reagan Commercials"
 1984: "California Zones"
 1984: "Reverse Angles"
 1984: "War Dance"
 1984: Scratch Video (compilation)

Other crew 
 1981: "Jinx" (music video by Tuxedomoon) (grip)
 1993: Steal America (cinematographer)

Further reading

References

External links 
 
 
 
 Glen Scantlebury & Lucy Phillips (2006 photograph)

American directors
Living people
1955 births
American film editors